Titus Simba (born 30 November 1941, date of death unknown) was a Tanzanian boxer. He competed at the 1968 Summer Olympics and the 1972 Summer Olympics. At the 1968 Summer Olympics, he lost to Chris Finnegan of Great Britain. He also won a silver medal at the 1970 British Commonwealth Games in the middleweight category.

References

1941 births
Year of death missing
Tanzanian male boxers
Middleweight boxers
Olympic boxers of Tanzania
Boxers at the 1968 Summer Olympics
Boxers at the 1972 Summer Olympics
Boxers at the 1970 British Commonwealth Games
Boxers at the 1974 British Commonwealth Games
Commonwealth Games silver medallists for Tanzania
Commonwealth Games medallists in boxing
Place of birth missing
Medallists at the 1970 British Commonwealth Games